MS Serif is a raster typeface packaged with Microsoft Windows.  It was introduced in Windows 1.x as "Tms Rmn" (which is shortened to Times Roman), and changed to its current name starting with Windows 3.1 (just as "Helv" became MS Sans Serif).

See also
Times New Roman

References

Windows XP typefaces
Microsoft typefaces
Typefaces and fonts introduced in 1992